"Slip Inside this House" is a song originally released by psychedelic rock band the 13th Floor Elevators as the first track on their 1967 album Easter Everywhere. At eight minutes, it is the longest track the band released on a studio album. A single version edited to just under four minutes was released by International Artists.

It is a good précis of the Elevators' style, containing most of their common elements—the electric jug of Tommy Hall, an insistent repetitive fuzz guitar riff, and impassioned vocals by Roky Erickson. In it, Tommy Hall, the lyricist, attempted to embody many of the elements of his psychedelic philosophy, which drew on elements of Eastern religions, Christian mysticism, Alfred Korzybski's general semantics, and the teachings of Gurdjieff, among other disparate influences. 

The song was covered by Scottish alternative rock band Primal Scream on their album Screamadelica, by Norwegian band Madrugada, by New York noise rock band Oneida on their album Come on Everybody Let's Rock, and by Scottish electronic band The Shamen on their 1992 promo Make It Mine.

References

1967 songs
The 13th Floor Elevators songs
Songs written by Roky Erickson